Malyutina is a rural locality in Katyrinsky Selsoviet Rural Settlement, Oktyabrsky District, Kursk Oblast, Russia. Population:

Geography 
The village is located on the Seym River (a left tributary of the Desna), 66 km from the Russia–Ukraine border, 25 km south-west of Kursk, 9 km west of the district center – the urban-type settlement Pryamitsyno, 4 km from the selsoviet center – Mitrofanova.

 Streets
There is Lesnaya Street and 212 houses.

 Climate
Malyutina has a warm-summer humid continental climate (Dfb in the Köppen climate classification).

Transport 
Malyutina is located 20 km from the federal route  Crimea Highway (a part of the European route ), 1 km from the road of regional importance  (Kursk – Lgov – Rylsk – border with Ukraine), 3 km from the nearest railway halt 433 km (railway line Lgov I — Kursk).

The rural locality is situated 36 km from Kursk Vostochny Airport, 126 km from Belgorod International Airport and 239 km from Voronezh Peter the Great Airport.

References

Notes

Sources

Rural localities in Oktyabrsky District, Kursk Oblast